The feudal barony of Cromar was a feudal barony with its caput baronium at Migvie Castle in Aberdeenshire, Scotland. The Earls of Mar held the barony until transferred to the Duke of Fife.

References

Bibliography
Michie, J.G.; History of Logie-Coldstone and Braes of Cromar; 1896; D. Wyllie & Son

History of Aberdeenshire
Baronies in the Baronage of Scotland